Holly Kenny (born 23 January 1995 in Leeds, England) is an English actress. She played the role of Sambuca Kelly on the BBC One school-based drama series Waterloo Road from 2009 until her character was killed off in 2011.

Career 
Kenny first appeared in Waterloo Road on the first episode of the fourth series, broadcast on Wednesday 7 January 2009. Her final episode was on seventh series, which was broadcast on Wednesday 8 June 2011. After the character of Sambuca was killed off after suffering with a long-term brain tumour.

She played Kimberley Crabtree in the British comedy television film titled Mischief Night (2006); she has also starred in the BAFTA award-winning BBC film White Girl (2008) playing the role of Leah.

Filmography

References

External links 

1995 births
Living people
English child actresses
English television actresses
English people of Irish descent
Actresses from Leeds
21st-century English actresses